Tolo may refer to:
 Tolo (surname)
 Tolo (dance), a regional U.S. term for a type of school dance where females invite males
 TOLO (TV channel), an Afghan TV station
 Tiele people, a Turkic people in inner Asia before the 8th century
 Tolo, an Aztec deity, for which Toluca was named.
 Tolo, a cultivar of Karuka

It may refer to the following places
 Tolo, Democratic Republic of the Congo
 Tolo, a place in Norheimsund, Norway
 Tolo, Greece, a Greek village
 Tolo, Guinea
 Gulf of Tolo (Indonesian: Teluk Tolo), a bay in Sulawesi, Indonesia
 Tolo Channel, a channel in Hong Kong
 Tolo Harbour, a sheltered harbour in Hong Kong
 Tolo Highway, an expressway in Hong Kong
 Tölö, the Swedish collective name for the neighbourhoods Etu-Töölö (Främre Tölö) and Taka-Töölö (Bortre Tölö) in Helsinki, Finland